Wallace Chafe (September 3, 1927 – February 3, 2019) was an American linguist. He was Professor Emeritus and research professor at The University of California, Santa Barbara.

Biography 
Chafe was born in Cambridge, Massachusetts. He was a student of Bernard Bloch and Floyd Lounsbury at Yale University, where he obtained his doctorate in 1958. From 1975 to 1986 he was the director of the Survey of California and Other Indian Languages at the University of California, Berkeley. He later moved to the University of California, Santa Barbara, and became professor emeritus at UCSB in 1991.

Chafe was a cognitivist; he considered semantics to be a basic component of language. He was a critic of Noam Chomsky's generative linguistics.

He was an influential scholar in indigenous languages of the Americas, notably Iroquoian and Caddoan languages, in discourse analysis and psycholinguistics, and also prosody of speech.

Together with Johanna Nichols, he edited a seminal volume on evidentiality in language in 1986.

While at UC Santa Barbara, he and his wife, linguist Marianne Mithun, established and directed The Wallace Chafe and Marianne Mithun Fund for Research on Understudied Languages.  The fund provides support for graduate students to cover expenses associated with language documentation projects for understudied languages.

Works 

1962. "Phonetics, semantics, and language." Language 38.335-344.
1963. Handbook of the Seneca Language, New York State Museum and Science Service, Bulletin #388; 
1967. Seneca Morphology and Dictionary. Smithsonian Contributions to Anthropology, vol. 4. Washington: Smithsonian Institution.
1968. "Idiomaticity as an Anomaly in the Chomskyan Paradigm." Foundations of Language 4.109-127.
1970. Meaning and the Structure of Language. Chicago: The University of Chicago Press.
1970. "A Semantically Based Sketch of Onondaga." International Journal of American Linguistics, Memoir 25 (Supplement to vol. 36, no. 2).
1976. "Givenness, contrastiveness, definiteness, subjects, topics, and point of view." In Subject and topic, edited by Charles N. Li, 25-55. New York: Academic Press.
1976. The Caddoan, Iroquoian, and Siouan languages. Trends in linguistics: State-of-the-art report (No. 3). The Hague: Mouton. .
1980. The Pear Stories: Cognitive, Cultural, and Linguistic Aspects of Narrative Production. Norwood, NJ: Ablex.
1986. Evidentiality: The Linguistic Coding of Epistemology, edited by Wallace Chafe and Johanna Nichols. Norwood, N.J.: Ablex Pub. Corp. 
1988. "Linking Intonation Units in Spoken English." In Clause Combining in Grammar and Discourse, edited by John Haiman and Sandra A. Thompson, 1-27. Amsterdam/Philadelphia: John Benjamins. 
1994. Discourse, Consciousness, and Time: The Flow and Displacement of Conscious Experience in Speaking and Writing. Chicago: The University of Chicago Press.
1996. "Beyond Beads on a String and Branches in a Tree." In Conceptual Structure, Discourse, and Language, edited by Adele Goldberg, 49-65. Stanford: Center for the Study of Language and Information.
2000. "The Interplay of Prosodic and Segmental Sounds in the Expression of Thoughts." Proceedings of the 23rd Annual Meeting of the Berkeley Linguistics Society, 1997, 389—401.
2000. "Loci of Diversity and Convergence in Thought and Language." In Explorations in Linguistic Relativity, edited by Martin Pütz and Marjolijn H. Verspoor, 101—123. Amsterdam/Philadelphia: John Benjamins.
2007. The Importance of Not Being Earnest: The Feeling Behind Laughter and Humor. Amsterdam/Philadelphia: John Benjamins. .
2014. A Grammar of the Seneca Language. UC Publications in Linguistics (Book 149). Berkeley: University of California Press. 
2018. The Caddo Language: A grammar, texts, and dictionary based on materials collected by the author in Oklahoma between 1960 and 1970. Petoskey, Michigan: Mundart Press.
2018. Thought Based Linguistics: How Languages Turn Thoughts Into Sounds. Cambridge University Press. .

References

External links 
 Wallace Chafe's homepage

1927 births
2019 deaths
People from Cambridge, Massachusetts
Yale University alumni
University of California, Santa Barbara faculty
Phoneticians
Semanticists
Linguists from the United States
American anthropologists
Linguists of Siouan languages
Linguists of Iroquoian languages
Paleolinguists
20th-century linguists
21st-century linguists
Fellows of the Linguistic Society of America